Richard "Richie" Marquez (born May 26, 1992) is an American soccer player who played most notably for Philadelphia Union in Major League Soccer (MLS).

Career

Education
Marquez went to Bloomington High School and graduated in 2010. He was a four-year starter for the University of Redlands Bulldogs in NCAA Division III. He received a Bachelor of Arts degree in communicative disorders in April 2014.

Professional
Marquez was the 44th selection in the 2014 MLS SuperDraft. For the 2014 season, he was loaned to the Harrisburg City Islanders of USL Pro. While there, he played an integral role in leading Harrisburg to the USL PRO championship game. He led USL PRO in minutes played (2,520) by playing the full 90 minutes in 28 games.

Marquez played his MLS debut on May 2, 2015, coming on as a fifth-minute substitute in a 1-0 loss against Toronto FC. He has since earned a starting role in the Union line-up. He scored his first goal with the Union on July 14 against the English Premier League newcomers AFC Bournemouth in the 36th minute of the match.

On September 13, 2019, Marquez was sworn is as a member of the Bensalem (Pennsylvania) Police Department.

References

External links
 

1992 births
Living people
American soccer players
American sportspeople of Mexican descent
Association football defenders
Philadelphia Union II players
Major League Soccer players
Penn FC players
Philadelphia Union draft picks
Philadelphia Union players
Soccer players from California
Sportspeople from Pomona, California
USL Championship players
University of Redlands alumni